John McEnroe was the defending champion but did not compete that year.

Anders Järryd won in the final 6–3, 6–2, 6–4 against Ivan Lendl.

Seeds

  Ivan Lendl (final)
  Anders Järryd (champion)
  Pat Cash (first round)
  Eliot Teltscher (semifinals)
  Paul McNamee (second round)
  Peter Fleming (quarterfinals)
 n/a
  John Fitzgerald (second round)

Draw

Finals

Section 1

Section 2

External links
 1984 Custom Credit Australian Indoor Championships draw

Singles